Rabidosa rabida, also known as the rabid wolf spider, is a species of spiders from the family Lycosidae, native to North America. In the United States it is found from Maine to Florida and west to Texas.

Description

The cephalothorax has two dark stripes. The abdomen has one stripe of the same color. Other parts of the spider are yellow. The females are larger than males, and have a body length of about an inch, while the males' body length comes as a half of that. The species has eight eyes: four above, and four below, which look more like a spider's moustache.

B. J. Kaston distinguishes R. rabida from R. punctulata by observing that the males of the former have front legs that are mostly black, whereas the latter have all legs of the same color.

The common namesake "rabid wolf spider" is thought to derive from the erratic, rapid movement of this species. However these spiders do not have rabies and cannot transmit it to humans.

Habitat and ecology

The species likes cotton fields and wooded areas. They usually live in holes and garbage of various kinds. Sometimes they might be found around ponds or in deep burrows that are covered by debris. This species doesn't build webs to catch prey, instead they weave the silk to wrap their prey in, or to protect their young. They hunt at night, by ambushing their prey, or chasing it. Sometimes, in order to catch their prey, they camouflage themselves as bark or leaves. During breeding, the male performs a "dance" in front of the female, and makes a noise with its legs. If mating is successful, the female will begin to lay its eggs and build an eggsack out of silk, which she will use to carry her young in. When the spiderlings are born, they ride on the mother's back until they are old enough to be on their own.

Rabid wolf spiders may bite if provoked, but their bite is not dangerous to humans.

Range
The rabid wolf spider is native to North America. In the United States, it is found in the east from Maine down to Florida, and west to Texas.

References

Spiders described in 1837
Endemic fauna of the United States
Spiders of the United States
Lycosidae